The 1986–87 Australian region cyclone season was the latest starting Australian season on record. A below-average tropical cyclone season, it officially started on 1 November 1986, and officially ended on 30 April 1987, with the last system dissipating on 27 May.

Seasonal summary

Systems

Tropical Storm 07S 

07S existed from 9 to 13 January 1987, in the northwest corner of the basin. While the system was not monitored by the Bureau of Meteorology, it was considered a tropical storm by the Joint Typhoon Warning Center (JTWC).

Severe Tropical Cyclone Connie 

Connie, 15 to 23 January 1987. Made landfall over Port Hedland on 19 January. Moderate damage was reported in Port Hedland and Whim Creek.

Tropical Cyclone Irma 

Irma, 19 to 22 January 1987, Gulf of Carpentaria.

Tropical Cyclone Damien 

Damien, 30 January to 9 February 1987, near Western Australia.

Severe Tropical Cyclone Jason 

Jason stuck the Northern Territory in February, 1987 damaging 20 buildings.

Severe Tropical Cyclone Elsie 

On 21 February, Cyclone Elsie formed near Western Australia. The storm then made landfall near the same region. Catastrophic damage was reported at Mandora Station.

Tropical Cyclone Kay 

Kay lasted from 6 to 17 April 1987. The storm impacted Papua New Guinea and Western Australia.

Tropical Cyclone Blanche 

Blanch, entered the Australian region basin on 22 May, and dissipated on 27 May 1987, off the east coast of Australia.

Other systems 
The precursor tropical low to Cyclone Uma formed within the region on 4 February, before it crossed 160°E and moved into the South Pacific basin later that day. As the system continued to move eastwards it crossed 160°E and moved into the South Pacific basin during 7 February, before TCWC Nadi named it Veli later that day on the basis of satellite derived evidence.

Seasonal effects 

|-
| Connie ||  || bgcolor=#| || bgcolor=#| || bgcolor=#| || Western Australia || || || ||
|-
| Irma ||  || bgcolor=#| || bgcolor=#| || bgcolor=#| || Western Australia, Northern Territory || || || ||
|-
| Damien ||  || bgcolor=#| || bgcolor=#| || bgcolor=#| || Western Australia || || || ||
|-
| Uma ||  || bgcolor=#|Tropical Low || bgcolor=#| || bgcolor=#| || None || None || None || None ||
|-
| Jason ||  || bgcolor=#| || bgcolor=#| || bgcolor=#| || Northern Territory, Queensland || || || ||
|-
| Veli ||  || bgcolor=#| || bgcolor=#| || bgcolor=#| || None || None || None || None ||
|-
| Elsie ||  || bgcolor=#| || bgcolor=#| || bgcolor=#| || Northern Territory, Western Australia || Significant || Significant || ||
|-
| Kay ||  || bgcolor=#| || bgcolor=#| || bgcolor=#| || Queensland, Papua New Guinea, Northern Territory, Western Australia || || || ||
|-
| Blanch(e) ||  || bgcolor=#| || bgcolor=#| || bgcolor=#| || Solomon Islands, Vanuatu || || || ||
|-

See also 

 Atlantic hurricane seasons: 1987, 1988
 Eastern Pacific hurricane seasons: 1987, 1988
 Western Pacific typhoon seasons: 1987, 1988
 North Indian Ocean cyclone seasons: 1987, 1988

References

External links 

 
Australian region cyclone seasons
Aust
Articles which contain graphical timelines
Tropical cyclones in 1986
Tropical cyclones in 1987